The 2019 Rose Bowl was a college football bowl game played on January 1, 2019 at the Rose Bowl Stadium in Pasadena, California. It was the 105th edition of the Rose Bowl Game, and one of the 2018–19 bowl games concluding the 2018 FBS football season. The game matched the Big Ten champion Ohio State Buckeyes against the Pac-12 champion Washington Huskies. Ohio State won the game, 28–23, to capture its eighth Rose Bowl championship in program history. Ohio State head coach Urban Meyer announced his retirement from coaching the month before, making the 2019 Rose Bowl his final game. Sponsored by the Northwestern Mutual financial services organization, the game was officially known as the Rose Bowl Game presented by Northwestern Mutual.

Pre-game activities

"The Melody of Life" was the theme chosen by Pasadena Tournament of Roses president Gerald Freeny. The game was presided over by Grand Marshal Chaka Khan, the "Queen of Funk.".

George Halas (Great Lakes Navy), Randall McDaniel (Arizona State), Pop Warner (Stanford), and Vince Young (Texas) were inducted into the Rose Bowl Hall of Fame prior to the game.

The 130th Rose Parade was held in downtown Pasadena the morning of the game, with floats from both conferences. The bands and cheerleaders from both schools also participated.

Teams
The teams playing in the Rose Bowl Game were the highest ranking teams from the Pac-12 Conference and Big Ten Conference that were not selected to play in a College Football Playoff (CFP) semifinal game; Washington and Ohio State, respectively. This game marks the first time those two programs met in a bowl game. This was the schools' 12th meeting; Ohio State led the all-time series, 8–3. Both teams arrived in Los Angeles by December 26 and participated in the Disneyland welcome at Disney California Adventure. Their practices were held at the Dignity Health Sports Park (formerly the StubHub Center) in nearby Carson.

Washington Huskies

Washington secured its berth in the Rose Bowl with a victory over Utah in the Pac-12 Football Championship Game on November 30. The Huskies entered the Rose Bowl with a 10–3 record (7–2 in conference).  This was Washington's 15th appearance in the Rose Bowl Game, with a record of 7–6–1 entering the game.

Ohio State Buckeyes

Ohio State, winner of the Big Ten Football Championship Game, became the Big Ten representative in the Rose Bowl when the team was not selected for the College Football Playoff. The Buckeyes entered the Rose Bowl with a 12–1 record (8–1 in conference). This was Ohio State's last game under head coach Urban Meyer, who announced his intent to retire on December 4.  This was Ohio State's 15th appearance in the Rose Bowl Game, with a record of 7–7 entering the game.

Game summary

Statistics

References

External links
 Box score at ESPN

Rose Bowl
Rose Bowl Game
Ohio State Buckeyes football bowl games
Washington Huskies football bowl games
Rose Bowl
Rose Bowl
21st century in Pasadena, California